Anisopodus affinis is a species of longhorn beetle of the subfamily Lamiinae that was described by Martins in 1974 It is known from Costa Rica, Panama, eastern Ecuador, and Bolivia.

References

Anisopodus
Beetles described in 1974